Boll may refer to:

Boll (surname)
Boll, an obsolete Scottish measure of volume
BOLL, a protein in humans
7873 Böll, a main-belt asteroid
Boll case, a 1958 International Court of Justice case
Boll KG,  Uwe Boll's personal production company
Boll, the protective case in which cotton grows
Boll, a community in the municipality of Vechigen, Switzerland
Boll, former German name of Bulle, Switzerland

See also
Bad Boll, a municipality in Germany
Bol (disambiguation)
Bolling (disambiguation)
Bølling (disambiguation)